Thomas Wilde, 1st Baron Truro,  (7 July 178211 November 1855) was a British lawyer, judge, and politician. He was Lord High Chancellor of Great Britain between 1850 and 1852.

Background and education
Born in London, Truro was the second son of Thomas Wilde, an attorney, and founder of Wilde Sapte, by his wife, Mary Anne (née Knight). He was educated at St Paul's School and was admitted as an attorney in 1805. He was the younger brother of Sir John Wylde. James Wilde, 1st Baron Penzance, was his nephew.

Legal and political career
Wilde subsequently entered the Inner Temple and was called to the bar in 1817, having practised for two years before as a special pleader. Retained for the defence of Queen Caroline in 1820, he distinguished himself by his cross-examination and laid the foundation of an extensive common law practice. In 1824, he was made Serjeant-at-Law, and in 1827 King's Serjeant.

He first entered parliament in the Whig interest as a member for Newark (1831–1832 and 1835–1841), afterwards representing Worcester (1841–1846). He was appointed Solicitor General in 1839, knighted in 1840, and became Attorney General in succession to Sir John Campbell in 1841. In 1846 he was appointed Chief Justice of the Court of Common Pleas, an office he held until 1850 when he became Lord Chancellor and was created Baron Truro of Bowes in the County of Middlesex. He held this latter office until the fall of the Russell ministry in 1852.

Family

Lord Truro first married Mary Devaynes in 1813 (the widow of William Devaynes (1730–1809) and daughter of William Wileman). They had three surviving children. After Mary died in 1840, he married Augusta Emma d'Este, daughter of Prince Augustus Frederick, Duke of Sussex and a first cousin of Queen Victoria, on 13 August 1845. There were no children from this marriage. Lord Truro died in London in November 1855, aged 76.  He was succeeded in the barony by his second but eldest surviving son, Charles. Lady Truro died in May 1866, aged 64.

Thomas Wilde is commemorated by a Blue plaque erected on the front of 2 Kelvin Avenue Bowes Park London N13 which reads: 
"Site of Bowes Manor 
THOMAS WILDE
1st BARON TRURO
1782 – 1855
LORD CHANCELLOR
1850 – 1852
LIVED HERE"

Wilde also lived at Truro House, Broomfield Park, Palmers Green London N13, a Grade II listed building that dates back to 1673.

Arms

Notes

References

External links
 

 

1782 births
1855 deaths
Attorneys General for England and Wales
Barons in the Peerage of the United Kingdom
Lord chancellors of Great Britain
Members of the Parliament of the United Kingdom for English constituencies
People educated at St Paul's School, London
UK MPs 1835–1837
UK MPs 1837–1841
UK MPs 1841–1847
UK MPs 1831–1832
UK MPs who were granted peerages
Members of the Inner Temple
Serjeants-at-law (England)
Members of the Privy Council of the United Kingdom
D'Este family
Members of the Judicial Committee of the Privy Council
Peers of the United Kingdom created by Queen Victoria